The Communauté d'agglomération Versailles Grand Parc is the communauté d'agglomération, an intercommunal structure, centred on the city of Versailles. It is located in the Yvelines and Essonne departments, in the Île-de-France region, northern France. It was created in November 2002. Its area is 123.6 km2. Its population was 267,033 in 2018, of which 85,205 in Versailles proper.

Composition
The communauté d'agglomération consists of the following 18 communes, of which one (Bièvres) in the Essonne department:

Bailly
Bièvres
Bois-d'Arcy
Bougival
Buc
La Celle-Saint-Cloud
Châteaufort
Le Chesnay-Rocquencourt
Fontenay-le-Fleury
Jouy-en-Josas
Les Loges-en-Josas
Noisy-le-Roi
Rennemoulin
Saint-Cyr-l'École
Toussus-le-Noble
Vélizy-Villacoublay
Versailles
Viroflay

References

Versailles
Versailles
Versailles